Dr Isabella McDougall Robertson (died May 1967), also known as Lady Frankau, was a British psychiatrist who specialised in alcohol and drug addiction.

A London-based "society doctor", her readiness to prescribe controlled drugs is credited with single-handedly addicting many British people to heroin.
From evidence she gave to the Brain Committee, she said the total between 1958 and 1964 was just over 500.

After the death of her first husband, Gordon Cunningham, she married the eminent surgeon Claude Frankau (1883–1967) in 1935. When her husband was knighted in the 1945 New Years Honours, Isabella Frankau became known as "Lady Frankau" in accordance with accepted usage.

As Dr Isabella Robertson, she was one of the first researchers at the Maudsley Hospital, initially working with Frederick Mott and Frederick Golla on the physical basis of psychoses. During the Second World War, she worked at Cambridge University's Psychological Laboratory on  the use of dietary supplements to improve the physical performance of servicemen. In the early 1950s she researched the use of subconvulsive electroshock therapy treatment for alcoholism.

References

External links
"Pop & Jazz: As though he had wings", independent.co.uk.
"A lost war", theguardian.com.
"Jazz star's diaries reveal society doctor who kept him high", The Sunday Telegraph, 28 February 1999.
"Healing the dragon disorder: Heroin use disorder intervention", Psychology PhD thesis

Year of birth unknown
1967 deaths
British psychiatrists
British women psychiatrists
Substance dependence
Wives of knights